WRJA may refer to:

 WRJA-FM, a radio station (88.1 FM) licensed to Sumter, South Carolina, United States
 WRJA-TV, a television station (channel 29, virtual 27) licensed to Sumter, South Carolina, United States